Afrotheora rhodaula is a species of moth of the family Hepialidae. It is native to South Africa.

References

External links
Hepialidae genera

Endemic moths of South Africa
Moths described in 1926
Hepialidae
Moths of Africa